Muldakayevo (Muldaqay) is a rural locality (a village) in Ilchigulovsky Selsoviet, Uchalinsky District, Bashkortostan, Russia. The population was 253 as of 2010. There are 5 streets.

Geography 
Muldakayevo is located 65 km northeast of Uchaly (the district's administrative centre) by road. Ilchigulovo is the nearest rural locality.

References 

Rural localities in Uchalinsky District